Constantin Gâlcă (born 8 March 1972) is a Romanian former footballer, and a manager, who was most recently manager of Saudi Professional League club Al-Hazem.

Equally at ease as a defensive or central midfielder and possessing an accurate long-range shot, he first made a name for himself at Steaua București. He then spent a full decade in Spain, playing in 318 matches in both major levels combined and representing five clubs, most notably Espanyol.

Additionally, Gâlcă appeared for Romania in two World Cups and as many European Championships, winning 68 caps. As a manager, he led teams including both Steaua and Espanyol.

Playing career

Club
Born in Bucharest, Gâlcă's senior career began at age 16 in the third division, with FC Progresul București. Only one year after he switched to the Liga I with lowly FC Argeș Pitești, for whom he played four times towards the end of the season, soon breaking into the Romanian national under-21 team.

After one more season with solid displays (31 games, two goals), Gâlcă signed with country giants CSA Steaua București, immediately beginning to produce: in his debut campaign, he scored five times in 26 matches.

Gâlcă stayed at Steaua two more years, netting 13 goals combined. After winning the domestic cup and having appeared in nearly 200 official matches, he left for Spain where he would remain the next 11 years. First stop was RCD Mallorca in the Balearic Islands, for which he scored 13 times to help to a promotion to La Liga (that total was tied for squad best). He then experienced a steady period with Barcelona-based RCD Espanyol, scoring five goals in his third season, which also ended with conquest of the Copa del Rey.

Gâlcă signed with Villarreal CF in summer 2001, but was deemed surplus to requirements midway through his second year, which he finished in the second division on loan to Real Zaragoza, being instrumental as the latter club returned to the top flight after one year of absence by starting in all his appearances.

Gâlcă still had three more solid seasons in the country with second-tier club UD Almería, playing 40 matches in his last season, one year before the Andalusians first reached the top division. He eventually returned to the national team with this team in 2005 – after a three-year absence – and retired in June 2006 at the age of 34.

International
Galca made his full debut for Romania on 22 September 1993, against Israel in a friendly. Called up for the 1994 FIFA World Cup he played three times during the tournament, against the United States in the group stage, in the famous 3–2 round-of-16 success against Argentina and in the penalty shootout defeat to Sweden in the last-eight.

From 1996 to 2000, Gâlcă featured in over forty more international games for Romania, often pairing with Dorinel Munteanu in central midfield. During the qualifying phase for the 1998 World Cup the national side were undefeated in their ten group fixtures, drawing only once and netting 37 goals, with him scoring two. In those finals and UEFA Euro 2000 the country was beaten, respectively, in the last-16 and last-eight, as he started in every match.

International goals
(Romania score listed first, score column indicates score after each Gâlcă goal)

Coaching career
Established in Almería after his playing days, Gâlcă took up coaching in 2009–10, starting with Almería's B-team in the fourth tier. He was sacked on 19 January 2010, after a string of poor results.

On 20 August 2013, Gâlcă was named head coach of Romania under-17s. He ended his contract in June 2014 and, also in that month, was appointed at league champions FC Steaua București on a two-year deal, replacing outgoing Laurențiu Reghecampf and leading the team to the double in his first and only season.

On 14 December 2015, Gâlcă replaced former club teammate Sergio at the helm of Espanyol. His first game in charge took place the following day, a 2–1 home win against Levante UD for the Copa del Rey (3–2 on aggregate). The following 27 May, having led the Periquitos to 13th, his contract was not renewed.

Gâlcă was hired by Al-Taawoun FC of the Saudi Professional League on 19 October 2016. For the following season, he moved to Al-Fayha FC in the same league. Having won once in nine games and with the club in the relegation zone, he was dismissed on 7 November 2017.

On 6 March 2019, Gâlcă returned to European football with Vejle Boldklub, last-placed in the Danish Superliga. His team won the second tier in 2019–20, and survived on return to the top flight; he resigned in May 2021 due to disagreements with the board.

Gâlcă returned to the Saudi top league on 10 December 2021, joining Al-Hazem F.C. after the dismissal of Hélder He left the club by mutual consent on 21 February 2022.

Honours

Player
Steaua București
Liga I: 1992–93, 1993–94, 1994–95, 1995–96
Cupa României: 1991–92, 1995–96
Supercupa României: 1994, 1995

Espanyol
Copa del Rey: 1999–2000

Manager
Steaua București
Liga I: 2014–15
Cupa României: 2014–15
Cupa Ligii: 2014–15
Supercupa României: Runner-up 2014

Vejle Boldklub
Danish 1st Division: 2019–20

Managerial statistics

References

External links
 
 
 
 
 

1972 births
Living people
Footballers from Bucharest
Romanian footballers
Association football midfielders
Liga I players
FC Progresul București players
FC Argeș Pitești players
CSA Steaua București footballers
La Liga players
Segunda División players
RCD Mallorca players
RCD Espanyol footballers
Villarreal CF players
Real Zaragoza players
UD Almería players
Romania international footballers
UEFA Euro 1996 players
1994 FIFA World Cup players
1998 FIFA World Cup players
UEFA Euro 2000 players
Romanian expatriate footballers
Expatriate footballers in Spain
Romanian expatriate sportspeople in Spain
Romanian football managers
La Liga managers
Danish Superliga managers
UD Almería B managers
RCD Espanyol managers
FC Steaua București managers
Saudi Professional League managers
Al-Taawoun FC managers
Al-Fayha FC managers
Vejle Boldklub managers
Al-Hazm FC managers
Romanian expatriate football managers
Expatriate football managers in Spain
Expatriate football managers in Saudi Arabia
Expatriate football managers in Denmark
Romanian expatriate sportspeople in Saudi Arabia
Romanian expatriate sportspeople in Denmark